The following events occurred in June 1925:

June 1, 1925 (Monday)
Babe Ruth returned to the New York Yankees for his first game of the season after a long illness. He went 0-for-2 with a walk as the visiting Washington Senators won 5–3. Lou Gehrig's consecutive games-played record streak began in the same game.
An intense and deadly heat wave began in parts of the United States.
Born: Dilia Díaz Cisneros, teacher and poet, in El Hatillo Municipality, Venezuela (d. 2017)
Died: Lucien Guitry, 64, French stage actor; Thomas R. Marshall, 71, 28th Vice President of the United States

June 2, 1925 (Tuesday)
The Philippine House of Representatives elections saw the reunited Nacionalista Party retain its majority.
Canada claimed all land between Alaska and Greenland up to the North Pole. 
Died: James Ellsworth, 75, American mine owner and banker

June 3, 1925 (Wednesday) 
The Australian Labor Party won the Tasmanian state election.
Dr. Charles Horace Mayo said that "the pace of modern life is serious, causing many of our present day ills. A return to the simple life would do away with the necessity for many doctors, but, alas, how can this be done?"
Born: Tony Curtis, film actor, in New York City (d. 2010)

June 4, 1925 (Thursday)
The government of Turkish President Mustafa Kemal Atatürk issued a decree effectively suppressing the Progressive Republican Party, the only opposition party in Turkey. The decree charged the Progressive Republicans with using religion as a political instrument.

June 5, 1925 (Friday)
Scottish pro Willie Macfarlane won the U.S. Open golf tournament.
Aristotle University of Thessaloniki was founded.

June 6, 1925 (Saturday)
Norway sent out two planes and two steamships to search for the North Pole seaplane expedition of Roald Amundsen which had been missing for over two weeks.
The American automobile brand Chrysler was founded.
The Daily Times of Nigeria was founded.
Died: Pierre Louÿs, 54, French poet and writer

June 7, 1925 (Sunday)
The Beaumont-Hamel Newfoundland Memorial was unveiled in France on grounds where the Battle of the Somme was fought in July 1916, commemorating the Dominion of Newfoundland forces who were killed in the Great War.
1. FC Nürnberg defeated FSV Frankfurt 1–0 to win the German football championship.
German mass murderer Wilhelm Brückner committed suicide after killing nine members of his family overnight.
Born: John Biddle, yachting cinematographer, in Philadelphia (d. 2008)

June 8, 1925 (Monday)
An explosion in a coal mine in Sturgis, Kentucky killed 17 people.
The Noël Coward comic play Hay Fever opened at the Ambassadors Theatre in the City of Westminster, England.
Born: Barbara Bush, First Lady of the United States, in New York City (d. 2018); Del Ennis, baseball player, in Philadelphia, Pennsylvania (d. 2018)

June 9, 1925 (Tuesday)
The United States heat wave eased after an estimated 500 deaths nationwide.
10 were killed and 48 injured in South East Queensland, Australia when a train derailed on a trestle bridge.

June 10, 1925 (Wednesday)
The United Church of Canada was inaugurated at the Mutual Street Arena in Toronto.

June 11, 1925 (Thursday)
Miner William Davis was killed in New Waterford, Nova Scotia, Canada when he was shot by a company policeman during a protest by striking miners. June 11 is now William Davis Miners' Memorial Day in Nova Scotia, recognizing all miners killed on the job in the province.
Born: William Styron, writer, in Newport News, Virginia (d. 2006)
Died: William Davis, 38, Anglo-Canadian miner

June 12, 1925 (Friday)
French Prime Minister Paul Painlevé flew to Morocco to assess the front line situation in the Rif War.

June 13, 1925 (Saturday)
Charles Francis Jenkins demonstrated synchronized transmission of pictures and sound at the Jenkins Labs in Washington, D.C.
Mike Genna of Chicago's Genna crime family was killed by police after a shootout against the North Side Gang.

June 14, 1925 (Sunday)
In a spontaneous reaction against the dictatorship of Miguel Primo de Rivera, the crowd at an FC Barcelona game jeered the  "Marcha Real" and applauded the English anthem "God Save the King" as performed by an English marching band. The football club was fined and shut down for six months in reprisal.
A significant German art exhibition of the Neue Sachlichkeit (New Objectivity) movement opened in Mannheim, with paintings by George Grosz, Otto Dix, Max Beckmann, Rudolf Schlichter and others. 
The Turkish football club Göztepe S.K. was founded.
Born: Pierre Salinger, White House Press Secretary, in San Francisco, California (d. 2004)
Olive Melva Tabe (née Taylor) born in Smithfield, South Australia, Australia

June 15, 1925 (Monday)
Both crews of the abandoned Roald Amundsen North Pole flight expedition piled into the N25 and barely managed to take off from their makeshift airstrip.
Born: Vasily Golubev, painter, in Medvezhje, Yaroslavl Oblast, USSR (d. 1985)

June 16, 1925 (Tuesday)
The crew of the N25 landed safely near the coast of Nordaustlandet, Svalbard, Norway.
The Rockport train wreck killed about 47 people near Hackettstown, New Jersey.
Died: Emmett Hardy, 22, American jazz cornetist (tuberculosis)

June 17, 1925 (Wednesday)
The Geneva Protocol was signed, prohibiting the use of chemical and biological weapons during warfare.
Prosper Poullet became Prime Minister of Belgium.
Born: Alexander Shulgin, American chemist and pharmacologist, in Berkley, California (d. 2014)
Died: Adolf Pilar von Pilchau, 74, Baltic German politician, regent of the United Baltic Duchy and baron

June 18, 1925 (Thursday)
A Reichsgericht judgment struck down a law for the purpose of confiscation of all the demesne lands of the Dukes of Saxe-Coburg and Gotha, ruling it was unconstitutional. The decision caused much public resentment in Germany and the question of expropriation of the dynastic properties of the former ruling houses of the German Empire became a contentious political subject.
Died: Robert M. La Follette, Sr., 70, American politician

June 19, 1925 (Friday)
Bank robber Everett Bridgewater and two accomplices were arrested in Indianapolis, Indiana.

June 20, 1925 (Saturday)
Benito Mussolini proclaimed the "Battle for Wheat", aimed at increasing Italy's wheat production to the point of becoming completely self-sufficient and no longer needing to import grain.
The Australian comedy film The Adventures of Algy was released.
Born: Audie Murphy, World War II hero and film actor, in Kingston, Texas (d. 1971)

June 21, 1925 (Sunday)
The Vietnamese Revolutionary Youth League was formally established, marking the beginning of the history of Communism in Vietnam.
Born: Maureen Stapleton, actress, in Troy, New York (d. 2006)

June 22, 1925 (Monday)
The National Fascist Party of Italy ended its fourth and final party congress in Rome. Such conferences had become increasingly unnecessary as the Fascist Party expanded its power and became essentially the state. In Benito Mussolini's closing speech he first used the word "totalitarian" when he referred to "our ferocious totalitarian will."
Died: Felix Klein, 76, German mathematician

June 23, 1925 (Tuesday)
The Soviet Union created the Lenin Prize for accomplishments relating to science, literature, arts, architecture and technology.
As Chinese protests against imperialism spread to a strike and boycott known as the Canton–Hong Kong strike, The Shaji Massacre occurred when British troops fired from Shamian Island across the river to Guangzhou, killing 52 and wounding 117.
The massive Gros Ventre landslide occurred in Wyoming. 
Born: Oliver Smithies, geneticist and Nobel laureate, in Halifax, West Yorkshire, England (d. 2017)

June 24, 1925 (Wednesday)
The United States and Hungary signed a Treaty of Friendship, Commerce and Consular Rights.

June 25, 1925 (Thursday)
Theodoros Pangalos became dictator of Greece.
Born: Robert Venturi, architect, in Philadelphia, Pennsylvania (d. 2018); June Lockhart, actress, in New York City (alive in 2021)

June 26, 1925 (Friday)
The Charlie Chaplin film The Gold Rush premiered at Grauman's Egyptian Theatre in Hollywood.
Jim Barnes won the British Open golf tournament.
Born: Richard X. Slattery, actor, in The Bronx, New York City (d. 1997)

June 27, 1925 (Saturday)
An earthquake of magnitude 6.6 struck near Helena, Montana. There were no casualties but damage was estimated at $150,000.

June 28, 1925 (Sunday)
F.C. Porto defeated Sporting CP 2–1 to win the Campeonato de Portugal.
Died: George A. Dodd, 72, American Brigadier General

June 29, 1925 (Monday)
An earthquake in Santa Barbara, California resulted in 13 casualties and an estimated $8 million damage. 
South Africa passed a bill excluding non-whites from skilled or semi-skilled work.
Born: Giorgio Napolitano, 11th President of Italy, in Naples (alive in 2021)
Died: Christian Michelsen, 68, 1st Prime Minister of Norway

June 30, 1925 (Tuesday)
The Swedish Theatre in Stockholm was destroyed by fire.
Born: Don Hayward, rugby player, in Pontypool, Wales (d. 1999)

References

1925
1925-06
1925-06